Fender is a surname. Notable people with the surname include:

 Andrew Fender, British local politician
 Brian Fender, British academic administrator
 Chuck Fender (born 1972), American music artist
 Edward Fender (1942–2021), Polish luger
 Freddy Fender (1937–2006), Mexican-American musician
 Harry Fender (1896–1995), American entertainer and police detective
 Janet S. Fender, American physicist
 Leo Fender (1909–1991), American guitar maker, founder of the eponymous company
 Norman Fender (1910-1983), Welsh dual-code rugby international player
 Percy Fender (1892–1985), English cricketer
 Sam Fender (born 1994), English musician

See also
 Bender (surname)
 Fender (disambiguation)
 Fenter